Pueraria montana var. lobata, the East Asian arrowroot, or kudzu vine, is a perennial plant in the family Fabaceae.

Names 
It is called gé in Chinese, kuzu in Japanese, and chik or gal (갈; 葛) in Korean.

Distribution 
The plant is native to East Asia (China, Taiwan, Japan, Korea), the Russian Far East, Southeast Asia (Indonesia, Malaysia, the Philippines, Thailand and Vietnam), and the Pacific (New Caledonia, Papua New Guinea, Solomon Islands, and Vanuatu).

Use 

The starch powder made from the East Asian arrowroot is called kudzu powder. Kudzu powder is used to make arrowroot tea in traditional medicines of China, Japan and Korea (in Korea the root unprepared is also used).

References 

Korean vegetables
montana var. lobata
Root vegetables